John T. Windsor (born April 3, 1940) is an American former basketball player for the San Francisco Warriors in the National Basketball Association (NBA). He played one season with the Warriors in the 1963–64 season. Windsor played college basketball for the Stanford Cardinal, where he was an All-Athletic Association of Western Universities first team selection in 1962. He was drafted in the 1962 NBA draft in the fifth round with the 39th overall pick by the Syracuse Nationals. In August 1963 was traded to San Francisco Warriors.

References

External links 
 
 John Windsor at justsportsstats.com

1940 births
Living people
American men's basketball players
Kansas City Steers players
Forwards (basketball)
San Francisco Warriors players
Stanford Cardinal men's basketball players
Syracuse Nationals draft picks